Robert W. "Bob" Mickle (1925-2009) was a city planner, community leader, and activist renowned for his contributions to the development and revitalization of communities in Des Moines, Iowa. He was active in his planning career for nearly 40 years, followed by a lifelong commitment to voluntary work which is recognized to have impacted today's city of Des Moines. Among his accomplishments are Des Moines Area Metropolitan Planning Organization, the skywalks in the downtown area, and the Mickle Center.

Bob Mickle was the founding director of Central Iowa Regional Planning Commission (mid-1960s-1972) where he continued to serve as director of planning after Joel Gunnells was hired as the executive director in 1972.

The Mickle Center 
Robert Mickle Business and Neighborhood Resource Center, locally known as "the Mickle Center", is an organization and also the name of a building serving the mission of the organization. The center was named after Robert Mickle for his contributions to Des Moines. The building, which had been designed and used as a senior center, was trusted to Bob Mickle for $1 by the City of Des Moines, with the condition of being operated as a nonprofit organization. Then it was renovated based on Bob's plan to involve office spaces, meeting rooms, and a community room. The center, officially registered with the name "Neighborhood Investment Corporation", has served the Sherman Hill neighborhood and the greater Des Moines community as a 501(c)(3) nonprofit organization for several years. It functions as a shelter for a number of charitable organizations and a venue for various social activities. The current president of the center is Jack Porter as of December, 2019.

References 

1925 births
2009 deaths
People from Des Moines, Iowa